Privacy is the ability of an individual or group to seclude themselves or information about themselves and thereby reveal themselves selectively.

Specific types of privacy include:
Financial privacy, privacy relating to the banking and financial industries
Information privacy, protection of data and information
Internet privacy, the ability to control what information one reveals about oneself over the Internet and to control who can access that information
Medical privacy, protection of a patient's medical information
Political privacy, the right to secrecy when voting or casting a ballot

Privacy may also refer to:
 Privacy (album), by Ophelie Winter
 Privacy (play), a 2014 play by James Graham
 "Privacy" (song), by Chris Brown
 Privacy (studio), the home studio of Warren Cuccurullo

See also
Private (disambiguation)
Privacy Act (disambiguation)
Privacy Commissioner (disambiguation)